Rawls Springs is an unincorporated community and census-designated place (CDP) located in Forrest County, Mississippi, United States. As of the 2020 census it had a population of 1,202.

Rawls Springs is located on the former Illinois Central Gulf Railroad.

A post office operated under the name Rawles Springs from 1905 to 1927.

Demographics 

As of the 2020 United States census, there were 1,202 people, 686 households, and 505 families residing in the CDP.

Notable person
 Mercy Baby, blues musician

References

Census-designated places in Mississippi
Census-designated places in Forrest County, Mississippi
Hattiesburg metropolitan area